A retractor is a surgical instrument used to separate the edges of a surgical incision/wound or to hold away certain organs and tissues (i.e. to provide tissue retraction) so that body parts underneath may be accessed during surgical operations.

The broad term retractor typically describes a simple steel tool possessing a curved, hooked, or angled blade, which is manually manipulated to help maintain a desired position of tissue during surgery. More sophisticated retractors may be clamped in place (usually to a tableside frame) or suspended at the end of a robotic arm. Retractors can also be "self-retaining" and no longer need to be held once inserted, having two or more opposing blades or hooks which are separated via spring, ratchet, worm gear or other method. The term retractor is also used to describe distinct, hand-cranked devices such as rib spreaders (also known as thoracic retractors, or distractors) with which surgeons may use to forcefully drive tissues apart to obtain exposure. Different surgery specialties can have specific kinds of retractors - e.g., for certain kinds of spinal surgery, such as Minimally Invasive Transforaminal Lumbar Interbody Fusions, some retractors are fitted both with suction and with fiberoptic lights to keep deep surgical wounds both dry and illuminated.

Surgical assistants, whether they be another surgeon, surgical residents or professionally trained procedure assistants (specifically Certified Surgical Assistants, Registered Nurse First Assistants, Physicians Assistants, or Surgical Technologists), may assist the operating surgeon in the process of retraction.

History 
Surgical retractors probably originate with very basic tools used in the Stone Age. Branches or antlers of various shapes were used to dig and extract food from the ground. As the use of tools evolved, a variety of instruments came about to substitute for the use of hooked or grasping fingers in the butchering of meat or dissection of bodies. The use of metals in tool making was of great importance. A variety of Roman metal instruments of the hook and retractor family have been found by archeologists. These instruments would generally be called hooks if the end was as narrow as the handle of the instrument. If the end was broad, it would be called a retractor. Also arising from this group of tools were other related tools for displacing (elevators and spatulas) and scooping (spoons and curettes).

In 4th century CE, Indian physician Susruta used surgical tools such as retractors. In a description of the procedure of tonsillectomy from the 7th century CE, Paul of Aegina documents the use of a tongue spatula to keep the tongue out of the way while a form of tonsil hook is used to bring the tonsil forward for excision. In 1000 CE Abu al-Qasim al-Zahrawi, also known as Albucasis or Abulcasis, described a variety of surgical instruments including retractors in his famous text Al-Tasrif. Vesalius described a variety of hooks and retractors in the 16th century. Jan Mikulicz-Radecki's invention of a hinged rib spreading retractor in 1904 prompted a flurry of development of retractors in the early 20th century, culminating in 1936 in our modern device based on the design of Enrique Finochietto.

Current 

The following is an incomplete list of surgical retractors in use:

Hand-held retractors
 Hohmann Retractor
 Lahey Retractor
 Senn Retractor
 Blair (Rollet) Retractor
 Rigid Rake
 Flexible Rake
 "Cat's Paws" - sharp, wide rakes
 Ragnell Retractor
 Linde-Ragnell Retractor
 Davis Retractor
 Volkman Retractor
 Farabeuf Retractor
 Mathieu Retractor
 Jackson Tracheal Hook
 Meyerding Finger Retractor
 Little Retractor
 Love Nerve Retractor
 Green Retractor
 Goelet Retractor 
 Cushing Vein Retractor
 Langenbeck Retractor
 Richardson Retractor 
 Richardson-Eastmann Retractor
 Deaver Retractor 
 Doyen Retractor
 Parker Retractor
 Parker-Mott Retractor
 Roux Retractor
 Mayo-Collins Retractor
 "Army-Navy" Retractor
 Ribbon Retractor - malleable, able to be bent as the surgeon desires

Self-retaining retractors
 Rultract Skyhook Retractor System
 Alms Retractor
 Lone Star Retractor - shaped ring retractor, segmented to allow individual 'lone stars' (hooks with lengths of stretchable rubber attached to them) to be placed in conjunction with it 
 Galaxy II retractor
 Gelpi Retractor
 Gutow Retractor
 Weitlaner Retractor
 Beckman-Weitlaner Retractor
 Beckman-Eaton Retractor
 Beckman Retractor
 Balfour Retractor - typically used in lower abdomen and pelvic surgery 
 Finochietto Retractor or Rib spreader
 Travers Retractor
 West Retractor
 Norfolk & Norwich Retractor

Gallery

References

Famous Canadian Physicians: Dr. Norman Bethune at Library and Archives Canada

Surgical instruments